Adams Township is one of fourteen townships in Cass County, Indiana, United States. As of the 2010 census, its population was 895 and it contained 378 housing units.

History
Adams Township was organized in 1835. It was named for John Quincy Adams, sixth President of the United States.

Geography

Unincorporated towns
 Hoover
 Little Charlie
 Twelve Mile
(This list is based on USGS data and may include former settlements.)

Adjacent townships
 Liberty Township, Fulton County (north)
 Union Township, Miami County (northeast)
 Jefferson Township, Miami County (east)
 Miami (south)
 Clay (southwest)
 Bethlehem (west)

Major highways
  Indiana State Road 16

Cemeteries
The township contains one cemetery, Mount Carmel.

References
 
 United States Census Bureau cartographic boundary files

External links

Townships in Cass County, Indiana
Townships in Indiana
Populated places established in 1835
1835 establishments in Indiana